Moshi Moshi may refer to:

 The Japanese greeting used during phone calls
 Moshi Moshi Records, a small London-based record label
 Moshi Moshi Harajuku, the debut mini-album by Japanese pop singer Kyary Pamyu Pamyu
 Moshi Moshi EP, an album by Digitalism (band)
 "Moshi Moshi", a song by Brand New on the EP Brand New / Safety in Numbers
 Moshi Moshi, an EP by Moe Shop
 Moshi Moshi, a 2010 novel by Japanese author Banana Yoshimoto
 "Moshi Moshi", a song by Poppy on the album Poppy.Computer